Grace Blakeley (born 26 June 1993) is an English economics and politics commentator, columnist, journalist and author. She is a staff writer for Tribune and panelist on TalkTV. She was previously the economics commentator of the New Statesman and has contributed to Novara Media.

Early life
Blakeley was born in Basingstoke in Hampshire. She is half Welsh on her father's side. She was privately educated at Lord Wandsworth College, and later attended the Sixth Form College, Farnborough. She studied philosophy, politics and economics at St Peter's College, Oxford, graduating with a first class honours degree. Blakeley then obtained a master's degree in African studies at St Antony's College, Oxford. After graduating, she worked as a management consultant for KPMG in their Public Sector and Healthcare Practice division. Blakeley then worked as a research fellow for a year at the left-wing think tank, Institute for Public Policy Research in Manchester, specialising in regional economic policy.

Career

Blakeley joined the magazine New Statesman in January 2019 as its economics commentator, writing a fortnightly column and contributing to the website and podcasts. Her articles for the magazine included support for Lexit and a Green New Deal. Her first book, Stolen: How to Save the World from Financialisation, was published by Repeater Books on 10 September 2019. Michael Galant writing for the openDemocracy website, praised the book as a "convincing critique of modern capitalism for socialists and skeptics alike". CapX's Diego Zuluaga commented in his review that it was a "sweeping polemic against the market economy", and felt the author had been selective in how she presented evidence for her arguments.

Blakeley became a staff writer for the democratic socialist magazine Tribune in January 2020. She sits on the Labour Party's National Policy Forum, which is responsible for policy development.

Blakeley's second book, The Corona Crash: How the Pandemic Will Change Capitalism, was published in October 2020.

Political views
Blakeley identifies as a democratic socialist and supports the use of capital controls. 
Blakeley supports Jeremy Corbyn and voted for him in the 2015 and 2016 Labour leadership elections, though she criticised him in 2016 for failing to "challenge the hegemony of neoliberalism" in the way she had imagined he would. Blakeley promotes a Green New Deal. Though she has emphasised it as running "counter to a capitalist system", she has argued that "even those who do not identify as socialists" may soon realise that a green industrial revolution is the "only option". She calls for a "fair transition towards a low-carbon economy". Blakeley is a Eurosceptic, and has branded the European Union as "neoliberal", "neo-colonial" and "run in the interests of financial and corporate elites".

Works

Books
 Blakeley, G. (2019). Stolen: How to Save the World From Financialisation (London: Repeater)
 Blakeley, G. (2020). The Corona Crash: How the Pandemic Will Change Capitalism (London: Verso)

Edited books
 Blakeley, G. (ed.) (2020). Futures of Socialism: The Pandemic and the Post-Corbyn Era (London: Verso)

References

External links
 British economist Grace Blakeley on Amazon, capitalism and socialism Detailed interview (3 ½ hours) with Tilo Jung and Hans Jessen, 2 November 2021 on YouTube
 Articles by Grace Blakeley at Tribune
 A World to Win podcast, hosted by Grace Blakeley
 Articles by Grace Blakeley at New Statesman
 

Living people
1993 births
21st-century English women writers
Alumni of St Antony's College, Oxford
Alumni of St Peter's College, Oxford
British anti-capitalists
Anti-globalization writers
British Eurosceptics
British women columnists
English columnists
English Marxists
English people of Welsh descent
English socialists
English women non-fiction writers
Labour Party (UK) people
Novara Media
People educated at Lord Wandsworth College
People from Basingstoke